WNTE may refer to:

 WNTE (FM), a radio station (89.5) licensed to serve Mansfield, Pennsylvania
 WNTE-LD, a television station (channel 36) licensed to serve Mayaguez, Puerto Rico
 WNTE, World-harmonized Not-to-Exceed, Engine emission off-cycle limits